Athis palatinus is a moth in the Castniidae family. It is found from Mexico south to Peru and Brazil (including Trinidad, Guyana, French Guiana, Suriname, Venezuela, Ecuador and southern Colombia).

The length of the forewings is 35–50 mm. The forewings are light brown dorsally with lighter areas that accent a darker wing base and a faint Y-shaped band that extends from the costal margin, into the subapical area, becoming slightly wider near the anal margin. There is a dark spot on the apex of the discal cell and toward the costal margin. There are one or two small hyaline (glass-like) round spots found in the sub apical area. The hindwings are yellowish brown, but dark brown at the base and yellowish at the costal and anal margins.

Adults have been observed feeding at flowers of Warscewiczia coccinea.

Subspecies
Athis palatinus palatinus (Surinam, Trinidad)
Athis palatinus ferruginosa (Lathy, 1922) (Peru)
Athis palatinus palatinoides (Houlbert, 1917) (Peru)
Athis palatinus staudingeri (Druce, 1896) (Panama)

References

Moths described in 1777
Castniidae